Machynlleth railway station is a railway station on the Cambrian Line in mid-Wales, serving the town of Machynlleth. It was built by the Newtown and Machynlleth Railway (N&MR), and subsequently passed into the ownership of the Cambrian Railways, the Great Western Railway, Western Region of British Railways and London Midland Region of British Railways.

History

The first railway station in Machynlleth was the narrow gauge Corris Railway, which opened its station building on the north side of the main-line goods yard in 1859. This was later made accessible from the mainline station by a flight of steps from the standard gauge platform.

The lower yard of the station contained a number of sidings that served transshipment wharves connected to the Corris Railway. A number of the quarries around Corris and Aberllefenni leased wharves here, notably Abercwmeiddaw from 1877 onwards.

The existing mainline station dates from 1863 with the opening of the Newtown and Machynlleth Railway. The following year the Aberystwith and Welsh Coast Railway opened the line as far as  via , and in 1867 the line was extended from Barmouth to  via  (then Portmadoc). In 1868 the station and lines were absorbed into the Cambrian Railways. The Cambrian Railways were absorbed by the Great Western Railway on 1 January 1922 as a result of the Railways Act 1921, and became part of British Railways in 1948.

In 2016 a new footbridge with a lift at both ends to improve disabled access between the platforms was completed. The previous bridge was donated to the Cambrian Heritage Railways.

Motive power depot

The railway built a small engine shed at the station in 1863. This was later expanded by Cambrian Railways, but the extensions were demolished after 1966, when the depot ceased to be used for servicing steam locomotives. Only the original building now survives.

Current operations
Similarly, most trains in the opposite direction divide here before continuing west. The service in each direction is approximately two hourly, although trains to Pwllheli are far less frequent on Sundays. The infrastructure along the line was upgraded during 2010/11, with the intention of allowing hourly trains to and from Aberystwyth. In the 2015-16 timetable, some additional Shrewsbury - Aberystwyth services operate to give an hourly interval frequency during the morning and evening peak periods.

Cambrian Line signalling has been centrally controlled from Machynlleth since the 1980s conversion of the route from traditional signalling to a radio-controlled 'RETB' system. On 26 March 2011, the new European Rail Traffic Management System signalling system went into operational use across the Cambrian Line controlled from Machynlleth. Two days of driver familiarisation followed, with passenger operation commencing on the morning of 28 March 2011. A new control centre has been built on the down side opposite the earlier signal box which has since been demolished.

A past train operator, Arriva Trains Wales, has also developed Machynlleth into the main depot for its fleet of Class 158 trains which provide all passenger services on the Cambrian Lines. Replacing the previous Victorian-era depot and yard, Arriva's depot opened in 2007 and prominently features environmentally friendly technologies such as rainwater harvesting and a wind turbine.

In 2011, The Bluebell Railway discovered a well-worn totem sign from Machynlleth during the excavating of Imberhorne Cutting as part of the northern extension to East Grinstead, which was used as a landfill site by the local council in the late 1960s. The extension was opened on 23 March 2013. The sign is now displayed in their new museum.

Facilities
The station has a staffed ticket office in the main building on platform 2. This is open throughout the daytime, however when closed tickets must be bought on the train as no ticket machine is provided. There are toilets, a waiting room and a cafe in the main building and waiting room and shelter on platform 1. Train running information is provided by customer help points, CIS displays, automated announcements and timetable posters. Step free access is provided to both platforms by means of a footbridge with a lift at both ends. The previous ramp up to platform 1 from street level having closed with the foundations of the new bridge being built across it.

References

External links

 
 Corris Railway

Railway stations in Powys
DfT Category E stations
Former Cambrian Railway stations
Railway stations in Great Britain opened in 1863
Corris Railway
Railway stations in Great Britain opened in 1879
Railway stations in Great Britain closed in 1879
Railway stations in Great Britain opened in 1883
Railway stations in Great Britain closed in 1931
Railway stations served by Transport for Wales Rail
Railway station